Joseph Alexander Ragland (born November 11, 1989) is an American-Liberian professional basketball player for Hapoel Holon of the Israeli Basketball Premier League. He played college basketball for North Platte Community College and Wichita State.

Early life
Ragland was born in Springfield, Massachusetts. He played basketball for West Springfield High School, where he earned the Lahovich Award as a senior.

College career
Ragland then committed to North Platte Community College in the NJCAA. Ragland was named a first team NJCAA all-American in 2010, as he led his team to an NJCAA tournament appearance, averaging 18.4 points per game on 56% from the field. Ragland, finished his career at North Platte as the college's all-time leading scorer with 1,286 points, having averages of 19.5 points and 3.1 assists per game.

His performances at North Platte caught the eye of Gregg Marshall who offered him a scholarship at Wichita State. As a junior with the Shockers, he started 19 games, led the team in assists helping it win the 2011 NIT. Ragland had a career-high scoring performance against UNLV with 31 points with another career high of 8 three-pointers made. In his senior season he averaged 13.4 points per game, ranking first nationally in true shooting percentage with 70.4%. For his performances in the 2011–12 season, he was voted in the first team of the Missouri Valley Conference. Totally in his two seasons with the Shockers, Ragland appeared in 69 games and had averages of 10 points, 3 assists, and 2.3 rebounds per game.

Professional career
Following two solid years as starting point guard for Wichita State he entered the 2012 NBA draft however he went undrafted. He next played in the 2012 NBA Summer League for the Golden State Warriors; although he played all 5 games for the undefeated Warriors he was not able to secure a contract.

Moving to Europe to start his professional career, he signed his first contract in August with UCAM Murcia of the Spanish Liga ACB, signing  a two-year contract. After accounting himself well for the Murcia, who were not in playoff contention or relegation danger, he was loaned near the end of the season in April 2013 to Italian side Pallacanestro Cantù to play in the Serie A playoffs. He proved to be an instant hit in Italy, playing in all their games and contributing greatly to their run to the semi-finals.

Cantù then moved to secure him for the next season, signing him on a one-year deal in July.   
It proved to be wise move for the club as he became an indisputable starter, contributing greatly in both the league and European second-tier Eurocup where he was respectively called up for the All-Star game and MVP of Round 4.

These performances caught the eye of Emporio Armani Milano, especially after he scored a season-high 27 points against them in April 2014, he signed a two-year contract in July with the EuroLeague side.
Ragland and Milano agreed to rescind the player's contract in July 2015.

On July 29, 2015, Ragland signed a one-year deal with the Turkish club Pınar Karşıyaka. On December 9, 2015, he left Karşıyaka and signed with the Italian club Sidigas Avellino for the rest of the season. On June 15, 2016, he re-signed with Avellino for one more season.

On July 21, 2017, Ragland signed a two-year deal with Russian club Lokomotiv Kuban. On August 10, 2018, Ragland moved to Belgrade and signed with KK Crvena zvezda for the 2018–19 season, with additional option for one more year.

On July 19, 2019, Ragland signed a one-year deal with Turkish club Darüşşafaka Tekfen, but never appeared in any  games because of an injury. On 12 December of the same year, he returned to Italy in the Serie A, signing again with Pallacanestro Cantù.

On July 31, 2020, Ragland signed in Israel with Hapoel Eilat. In 2020-21 he was second in the Israel Basketball Premier League in assists per game (7.5).

On July 21, 2021, he signed with Hapoel Holon of the Israeli Basketball Premier League.

Personal
He obtained Liberian citizenship in November 2012. Under the Cotonou Agreement it allows him to be counted as an EU player in most European leagues such as the Italian League and the Spanish League.

Career statistics

Euroleague

|-
| style="text-align:left;"| 2014–15
| style="text-align:left;"| Milano
| 24 || 9 || 18.6 || .386 || .346 || .828 || 1.6 || 2.9 || .6 || .0 || 7.2 || 6.0
|- class="sortbottom"
| style="text-align:left;"| Career
| style="text-align:left;"|
| 24 || 9 || 18.6 || .386 || .346 || .828 || 1.6 || 2.9 || .6 || .0 || 7.2 || 6.0

Domestic leagues

References

External links
 Player profile at Legabasket.it, BSL.org.tr, and Liga ACB
 Joe Ragland at eurobasket.com
 Joe Ragland at euroleague.net
 Joe Ragland at fiba.com
 Joe Ragland at tblstat.net
 Joe Ragland Wichita State biography
 

1989 births
Living people
20th-century African-American people
21st-century African-American sportspeople
ABA League players
African-American basketball players
American expatriate basketball people in Israel
American expatriate basketball people in Italy
American expatriate basketball people in Russia
American expatriate basketball people in Serbia
American expatriate basketball people in Spain
American expatriate basketball people in Turkey
American men's basketball players
Basketball players from Massachusetts
CB Murcia players
Hapoel Eilat basketball players
Hapoel Holon players
Junior college men's basketball players in the United States
Karşıyaka basketball players
KK Crvena zvezda players
Lega Basket Serie A players
Liberian expatriate sportspeople in Israel
Liberian expatriate sportspeople in Spain
Liberian men's basketball players
Liga ACB players
Olimpia Milano players
Pallacanestro Cantù players
PBC Lokomotiv-Kuban players
People from West Springfield, Massachusetts
Point guards
S.S. Felice Scandone players
Shooting guards
Wichita State Shockers men's basketball players
American people of Liberian descent